The following article lists the most valuable corporate brands in the world according to different estimates by Kantar Group, Interbrand, Brand Finance and Forbes. Factors that influence brand value are sales, market share, market capitalization, awareness of a brand, products, popularity, image, etc. Readers should note that lists like this, while informative, are somewhat subjective, as no single metric exists for determining valuation for brands.

Kantar list (2022) 
The 10 most valuable company brands in 2022 according to Kantar.

Interbrand list (2022) 
The 10 most valuable company brands in 2021 according to Interbrand.

Brand Finance list (2022) 
The 10 most valuable company brands in 2022 according to Brand Finance.

Forbes list (2020) 
The 10 most valuable company brands in 2020 according to Forbes magazine.

Most valuable brands over time

Top 10 since 2007 (Kantar)
The 10 most valuable brands every year since 2007 according to Kantar.

2000 (Interbrand)
The 20 most valuable company brands in 2000 according to Interbrand.

See also 
 List of largest companies by revenue
 List of largest corporate profits and losses
 List of largest employers
 List of largest United States–based employers globally
 List of public corporations by market capitalization (also dubbed "most valuable companies")

References 

Brand Value
Brands, Value
Economy-related lists of superlatives